Kátia Andréia Caldeira Lopes (born July 13, 1973 in Barranquilla) is a volleyball player. She competed for Brazil at the 2000 Summer Olympics in Sydney, Australia. There, she won the bronze medal with the Women's National Team.

References
  UOL profile

1973 births
Living people
Brazilian women's volleyball players
Volleyball players at the 2000 Summer Olympics
Olympic volleyball players of Brazil
Olympic bronze medalists for Brazil
Volleyball players from Rio de Janeiro (city)
Olympic medalists in volleyball
Medalists at the 2000 Summer Olympics